Michael Herrera (born 5 June 1985) is a Cuban track and field sprinter who specialises in the 200 metres. He has a personal best of 20.31 seconds for the event and has also recorded 10.16 seconds for the 100 metres. He was a semi-finalist at the 2011 World Championships in Athletics and has represented Cuba at the Pan American Games in 2007 and 2011.

Biography
Born in Los Palacios, Pinar del Río, he began competing at the senior level in 2005 and finished third in both the 100 m and 200 m at the Cuban Championships that year. He won the 200 m and the 4×100 metres relay at the 2005 ALBA Games. He was selected for these events at the 2005 Central American and Caribbean Championships and came sixth and fourth, respectively. He won the 200 m at the Barrientos Memorial in 2006. He reached the semi-finals of both the sprints at the 2006 NACAC Under-23 Championships in Athletics. At the 2006 CAC Games he helped the relay team to fourth (running alongside Yoel Hernández and Dayron Robles) and was a 200 m semi-finalist.

Herrera defended both his titles at the 2007 ALBA Games in Caracas and ran a personal best of 20.31 seconds. He was a finalist in the 200 m at the 2007 Pan American Games and helped the relay team reach the final. He only had a season's best of 20.81 seconds in 2008 and did not compete internationally. Herrera switched his focus to the 100 m event in the 2009 season and was rewarded with a personal best of 10.16 seconds, wins at the Barrientos Memorial and the 2009 ALBA Games. He placed seventh in the final at the 2009 CAC Championships.

A quiet 2010 was highlighted by a 100 m win at the Barrientos Memorial with a hand-timed 9.7 seconds. He began doubling up in the sprint events for the 2011 season and won both events at the Barrientos meet. He won silver medals in both events at the 2011 ALBA Games and helped Cuba take the relay title. His season's best of 20.52 seconds for the 200 m was enough for a place on the Cuban team for the 2011 World Championships in Athletics and ended the competition in fourth in the semi-finals. He was also selected for the 2011 Pan American Games and was a semi-finalist in both the individual sprints, as well as running Cuba to fourth in the relay final with Roberto Skyers. In 2012 he placed fifth in the 200 m at the Ibero-American Championships, and a run of 20.64 seconds in Havana gained him a place in the Cuban squad for the 2012 London Olympics.

Personal best
100 m: 10.16 s (wind: -1.3 m/s) –  La Habana, 23 April 2009
200 m: 20.31 s (wind: +2.0 m/s) –  Caracas, 11 May 2007

Achievements

References

External links
 
 

Living people
1985 births
Cuban male sprinters
Pan American Games competitors for Cuba
Athletes (track and field) at the 2011 Pan American Games
Athletes (track and field) at the 2007 Pan American Games
People from Pinar del Río
Athletes (track and field) at the 2012 Summer Olympics
Olympic athletes of Cuba
20th-century Cuban people
21st-century Cuban people